Camino al Tagliamento is a comune (municipality) in the Province of Udine in the Italian region Friuli-Venezia Giulia, located about  northwest of Trieste and about  southwest of Udine.

Camino al Tagliamento borders the following municipalities: Codroipo, Morsano al Tagliamento, San Vito al Tagliamento, Varmo.

References

External links
 Official website

Cities and towns in Friuli-Venezia Giulia